Voice short codes enable UK mobile phone users to dial a 5-digit short code (e.g. 61500) as an alternative to a standard geographic (e.g. 01 or 02 prefix) or non-geographic (e.g. 03, 08 or 09 prefix) long number. The consumer pays anything between 0p and £2/min. The short code is usually forwarded to a standard geographic number - typically an existing call centre or interactive voice response (IVR) system.

The use of non-geographic telephone numbers in the United Kingdom has been a major cause of bill shock. Pollster YouGov found that 49% of mobile users have been surprised to see how much they have been charged for calling non-geographic numbers and 90% believe organisations should make the cost of these calls clearer. According to Ofcom, UK consumers paid around £1.9 billion for calls to non-geographic numbers in 2009.

Following their success in TV voting on shows like BBC's The Voice UK, voice short codes are now being used as an alternative to non-geographic numbers. Voice short codes enable businesses to provide greater transparency on call rates, as the rate is fixed irrespective of which network is being used to make the call.

Voice short codes are available across all the UK mobile network operators - namely Vodafone, 3, EE, Virgin Mobile and O2. Voice short codes are provided by mobile aggregators - who have a commercial relationship with each of the mobile operators.

References

External links 
 Vodafone voice short codes
 Orange voice short codes
 O2 launches voice short codes

Telecommunications in the United Kingdom